The V. V. College of Science and Technology (Vanika Vaisya College of Science and Technology ), a self-financing institution (managed by Vanika Vaisya Educational and Employment Trust, Thiruvananthapuram) situated in Kanjikode, 17 km away from Palakkad, Kerala. The college started in 2002 with an aim to provide the youngsters, especially in the rural areas to pursue studies in non-conventional courses. The college is affiliated to the University of Calicut.

There are 30 members in the teaching faculty. The team of staff of the College has high academic competitiveness, scholarship and dedication.

Kerala Vanika Vaisya Sangham is being given various Scholarships to the students belonging to Vanika Vaisya Community annually. The Scholarships so given are to the students who are most successful in SSLC, PlusII, University, entrance Examinations, Arts & Sports events etc. as detailed below:

In respect of SSLC all A+ students, 9 A+ Students, 8 A+ Students.

Plus Two-Science, Commerce & Humanities-State First

CBSE - Science, Commerce & Humanities - State First

For University Examinations - All courses to those students come 1st, 2nd and 3rd from among the candidates applied for the scholarship

Entrance Examinations-All Students in the Entrance Rank List-both Medical and Engineering.

MBBS & Btech-Final Examinations-Top Rank

Most successful students in respect of Arts & Sports events in District, State and all India level.

Management
 Principal: Prof.(Dr.) V.K. Sudhakaran
 Secretary: Shri Kuttapan Chettiar
 Management: Vanika Vaisya Educational and Employment Trust
 Established: 2002
 University: University of Calicut

Courses

UG Courses 
  B Sc Computer Science
  B Sc Electronics
  B C A (Bachelor of Computer Applications)
  B Com (Finance)
  B Com with Computer Applications
  B B A (Bachelor of Business Administration
  B Sc. Mathematics
  B Sc Geography

PG Courses 
  M.Com Finance
  M.Sc Computer Science

Location
The college is situated in Chullimada in Pudussery Panchayath near Kanjikode, very near to the proposed Railway Coach Factory and Indian Institute of Technology Palakkad. The surrounding abounds in scenic beauty and is extremely suitable for academic pursuits. The campus extents over 17 acres of land and is easily accessible by road from Palakkad. The campus is 17 km from Palakkad and the college has arranged paid transportation for students and staff.

Transport
 By road: the college can be reached by traveling 17 km from Palakkad town.
 By train: the college is 2 km from Kanjikode Railway station.

References

External links
www.vvcollege.co.in 

Colleges in Kerala
Colleges affiliated with the University of Calicut
Universities and colleges in Palakkad district
Educational institutions established in 2002
2002 establishments in Kerala